Wayne Chapman may refer to:

 Wayne Chapman (American football) (1937–2017), American football player and coach
 Wayne Chapman (basketball) (born 1945), American former professional basketball player